Paul E. Ceruzzi (born 1949) is curator emeritus at the Smithsonian's National Air and Space Museum in Washington, D.C.

Life
Ceruzzi received a BA from Yale University in 1970 and received a Ph.D. from the University of Kansas in 1981, both in American studies. Before joining the National Air and Space Museum, he was a Fulbright scholar in Hamburg, Germany, and taught History of Technology at Clemson University in Clemson, South Carolina. Ceruzzi is the author and co-author of several books on the history of computing and aerospace technology. He has curated or assisted in the mounting of several exhibitions at NASM, including: Beyond the Limits - Flight Enters the Computer Age, The Global Positioning System - A New Constellation, Space Race, How Things Fly and the James McDonnell Space Hangar of the Museum's Steven F. Udvar-Hazy Center, at Dulles Airport.

Works
Reckoners: The Prehistory of The Digital Computer (1983)
Beyond the Limits: Flight Enters the Computer Age (1989)
Landmarks in Digital Computing: A Smithsonian Pictorial History (with Peggy A. Kidwell, 1994)
A History of Modern Computing (1998)
  
Internet Alley: High Technology in Tysons Corner, 1945-2005 (2008).
Computing: A Concise History (2012)
GPS (2018)

References

External links
Ceruzzi's The MIT Press Catalog
ComputerHistory.org
Paul E. Ceruzzi Collection on Konrad Zuse.  Charles Babbage Institute, University of Minnesota.  Collection contains published reports, articles, product literature, and other materials on Konrad Zuse.
Paul Ceruzzi Papers, George Mason University

Living people
Smithsonian Institution people
1949 births
Yale University alumni
University of Kansas alumni
Clemson University faculty
History of computing